The Irish Republic was a revolutionary state in Ireland between 1919 and 1922. "Irish Republic" may also refer to:

 Irish Republic (1798), a revolutionary state proclaimed during the Irish Rebellion of 1798
 Easter Rising, when an Irish Republic was proclaimed by rebels
 Proclamation of the Irish Republic
 The Irish Republic, a 1937 history book by Dorothy Macardle
 Republic of Ireland, the modern state, sometimes referred to as the "Irish Republic"